Lugagnac is a commune in south-western France. Lugagnac is situated in the Lot department, Occitanie region 24 kilometres from Cahors, the department capital. The commune is 497 kilometres from Paris, France.

Popular places to visit nearby include Saint-Cirq-Lapopie at 8 km and Cajarc at 12 km.

See also
Communes of the Lot department

References

Communes of Lot (department)